The European Journal of Mass Spectrometry is a peer-reviewed scientific journal covering all areas of mass spectrometry. It is published by SAGE Publishing and the editor-in-chief is Jürgen Grotemeyer (University of Kiel).

See also
Mass Spectrometry Reviews
Journal of Mass Spectrometry
Journal of the American Society for Mass Spectrometry
Rapid Communications in Mass Spectrometry

External links

Mass spectrometry journals
SAGE Publishing academic journals